Tomas Tammemets (born 18 November 1991), better known by his stage name Tommy Cash (sometimes stylised as TOMM¥ €A$H), is an Estonian rapper and singer. He is known for raunchy lyrical themes and provocative music videos.

Early life and education
Cash was born Tomas Tammemets in Tallinn, Estonia. He is reportedly of mixed ethnic Estonian, Russian,  and Kazakh ancestry. Cash has described himself as Estonian first and foremost, then "Eastern European in his soul", and "Scandinavian in a CV". Cash was raised in the working-class Kopli subdistrict of Tallinn.

In his youth, Cash was reportedly a graffiti artist. He has said that his drug use led him to be "ejected" from schooling. He never graduated from secondary school, despite sitting for exams, and later took up painting and dancing instead of formal education.

Career

In the dance scene, Cash is a known freestyle dancer with a very distinct style, using elements of popping, krumping, and breakdancing.

In 2018, Cash released a clothing line that subversively imitates western styles with eastern elements and in-jokes.

In November 2018, Cash released his second album, ¥€$, to positive reviews from Clash and Paper. The album features vocal performances from MC Bin Laden, Charli XCX, Rick Owens, and Caroline Polachek, as well as production from Danny L Harle, A. G. Cook, Amnesia Scanner, and Boys Noize.

In 2019, Cash had an exhibition at Kumu art museum in Tallinn. Collaborating with Rick Owens, he exhibited his own sperm, among other artefacts.

Also in 2019, Cash was the opener for Oliver Tree's Goodbye, Farewell Tour alongside NVDES.

On 30 January 2020, Cash unveiled his first official tour in the United States, starting on March 22. Due to the COVID-19 pandemic, the tour was re-scheduled for 2022.

Discography

Albums 
Euroz Dollaz Yeniz (2014)
¥€$ (2018)

Extended plays 
 C.R.E.A.M. (2014)
 Moneysutra (2021)

Singles

Collaborations
 "Give Me Your Money" – Little Big featuring Tommy Cash, from Funeral Rave (2016)
 "Apel." PIMP FLACO, TOMMY CASH & KINDER MALO (2016)
 "Cry" – TOMM¥ €A$H X IC3PEAK (2017)
 "Delicious" – Charli XCX featuring Tommy Cash, from Pop 2 (2017)
 "Volkswagen Passat" – DJ Oguretz featuring Tommy Cash, from Power (2015)
 "Follow Me" – Little Big featuring Tommy Cash, from Antipositive, Pt. 2 (2018)
 "Who" – Modeselektor featuring Tommy Cash, from Who Else (2019)
 "Impec" – Lorenzo featuring Tommy Cash and Vladimir Cauchemar, from Sex In The City (2019)
 "Click" – Charli XCX featuring Kim Petras and Tommy Cash, from Charli (2019)
 "Forever In My Debt" – Borgore featuring Tommy Cash (2019)
 "Heartbass" - Salvatore Ganacci featuring Tommy Cash (2020)
 "xXXi_wud_nvrstøp_ÜXXx" (Remix) - 100 Gecs featuring Tommy Cash and Hannah Diamond, from 1000 Gecs and the Tree of Clues (2020)
 "Alright" - A. G. Cook, from 7G (2020)
 "Benz-Dealer" - Quebonafide (2021)
 "Nude" - Boys Noize featuring Tommy Cash, from +/- (2021)
 "Turn It Up" - Oliver Tree and Little Big featuring Tommy Cash, from EP Welcome To The Internet (2021)

Music videos

References

External links
 

1991 births
21st-century Estonian male singers
English-language singers from Estonia
Estonian people of Russian descent

Estonian people of Kazakhstani descent
Estonian rappers
Living people
Musicians from Tallinn